Concerto for Trombone and Orchestra was written in 1924 by Danish composer Launy Grøndahl during his time in Italy. It was inspired by the trombone section of the Orchestra of the Casino Theatre in Copenhagen (of which Grøndahl had been a violinist since the age of thirteen). This work was premiered in Copenhagen by the Orchestra of the Casino Theatre with soloist Vilhelm Aarkrogh, the principal trombonist of the orchestra. The work has been recorded by Joseph Alessi, Brett Baker, Håkan Björkman, Jesper Juul Sørensen, Massimo La Rosa, Christian Lindberg, Jacques Mauger, and Branimir Slokar, among others.

Structure
The concerto has a duration of approximately 15 minutes and is cast in three movements:
 Moderato assai ma molto maestoso
 Quasi una Leggenda: Andante grave
 Finale: Maestoso - Rondo

Instrumentation
This score is written for the following instruments:

 Brass
 Solo trombone
 horn in F
 2 trumpets
 Woodwinds
 2 flutes
 2 oboes
 2 clarinets in Bb
 2 bassoons
 Strings
 1st violins
 2nd violins
 violas
 cellos
 double basses
 piano

Additional versions exist for:
 solo trombone and concert band.
 solo trombone and brass band.
 solo trombone and brass ensemble (3 trumpets, 2 horns, 2 trombones, euphonium and tuba), edited by Michael Stewart.
 solo trombone and piano.

References

External links
 Introduction to the piece(in traditional Chinese)

Grondahl, Launy
1924 compositions